Phylocentropus is a genus of caddisflies in the family Dipseudopsidae. There are about 17 described species in Phylocentropus.

Species
These 17 species belong to the genus Phylocentropus:

 Phylocentropus auriceps (Banks, 1905)
 Phylocentropus carolinus Carpenter, 1933
 Phylocentropus hansoni Root
 Phylocentropus harrisi Schuster & Hamilton, 1984
 Phylocentropus lucidus (Hagen, 1861)
 Phylocentropus narumonae Malicky & Chantaramongkol, 1997
 Phylocentropus orientalis Banks, 1931
 Phylocentropus placidus (Banks, 1905)
 Phylocentropus shigae Tsuda, 1942
 Phylocentropus simplex Ulmer, 1912
 Phylocentropus vietnamellus Mey, 1995
 † Phylocentropus antiquus Ulmer, 1912
 † Phylocentropus cretaceous Wichard & Bölling, 2000
 † Phylocentropus ligulatus Ulmer, 1912
 † Phylocentropus spiniger Ulmer, 1912
 † Phylocentropus succinolebanensis Wichard & Azar, 2018
 † Phylocentropus swolenskyi Wichard & Lüer, 2003
Fossil species are also known from the Barremian aged Lebanese amber and the Turonian aged New Jersey amber.

References

Further reading

External links

 

Trichoptera genera
Articles created by Qbugbot